Robert Kirchhoff (born May 7, 1968) is a Slovak independent film director, producer, cinematographer, and scriptwriter.

Biography

Robert Kirchhoff was born in Nitra, Slovakia.

Between 1995-2000 he studied film directing at the Academy of Performing Arts in Bratislava, where he graduated as M.A. (2000), later as Art. Dr. (2006) and tenured associate professor in documentary film. In his professional career he filmed and produced many feature documentaries, many of which achieved a significant recognition at numerous festivals domestically and internationally. His filmmaking focuses on current social topics that cope with “traumatic” heritage of historical events in Central Europe in the 20th century. To name the few, he provides a critical insight into current situation of minorities at the edge of society in post-communist Slovakia (Black Word/Calo Lav, 1999), or explores the social and moral identity in the wake of the “capitalism” in former Eastern Bloc (Hey you Slovaks, 2002). His documentary Normalization/Kauza Cervanova, 2013 deals with the juridical crime.

The screenings and retrospective of his work include such venues as Anthology of Film Archives, New York, USA (2006), Columbia University, New York (2004) or New School University New York (USA), (1999).

Since 2002 he is a founder and CEO of atelier.doc Ltd., which was established as an independent production organization focusing primarily on production of documentary films and TV movies (www.atelierdoc.sk). One of its major projects is cultural chronicle Alternative archive which collects social and cultural events, memories, statements and a free series of social documentary films Film and society which Robert Kirchhoff is an author, producer and literary advisor.

Since 2003 he also participated as a producer or a co-producer on some of the most significant and awarded Slovak and Czech documentaries that gained national and international recognition. These include such titles as Disease of the Third power (dir. Zuzana Piussi), Made in Ash (dir. Iveta Grófová), Obscurantist and his lineage (dir. Karel Vachek). He also coproduced a documentary Blind Love (dir. Juraj Lehotsky), which was awarded by CICAE award at Cannes 2008.

In addition to his filmmaking career, Robert Kirchhoff holds an academic appointment of associate professor at the Academy of Performing Arts in Bratislava where he leads the course: the Directing of documentary film and Auteur documentary film. He also works as a lecturer of film courses at Summer Film School in his native Slovakia or in neighboring countries of Central Europe.

Filmography
 Merry Christmas (1996)
 Recollection (1997)
 Loses and Return (1998)
 Black Word/Kálo lav (1999)
 Open windows (2000)
 Guest again the Grain (2000)
 You are my Sunshine (2000)
 On the Water (2001)
 Hey You Slovaks (2002)
 Flowers of the Evil (2003)
 Glamour and Misery (2005)
 Ghost in the Machine (2010)
 Normalization a. k. a. Kauza Cervanová (2013)

TV projects
 Burian Women Day (2007-2008, script and director)
 Right for the People (2011, script and director)
 Thematical evening with UNICEF – Rights of the children (dramaturgy and script, 2002)
 Children News, TV series (dramaturgy, 2002)
 The Volunteers (dramaturgy, 2001)
 The Way for a dream (dramaturgy, 2004)
 Film and the society (2013), dramaturgy, producer
 Replay (2013, script and director)

Producer
 Crying of Angels (2005, director Zuza Piussi)
 Blind loves (2008 – co-producer, director Juraj Lehotsky)
 Shelter story (2009, director Zuza Piussi)
 Disease of The Third Power (2011, director Zuza Piussi)
 Obscurantist and his lineage (2011, co-producer)
 Made in Ash (2012, co-producer)
 Film and the society (TV series) 2013

Festivals screenings and awards
 Talent Prize, (1999), 34. annual IFF Academia Film Olomouc (CZ)
 Talent Prize, (2000), 35. annual IFF Academia Film Olomouc (CZ)
 37th annual IDSFF Kraków (PL), 2000
 16th annual IDFF Parnu (EST), 2000
 6th annual IDFF Jihlava (CZ), 2002
 RELEASED! Ambiguous Freedom: The Iron Curtain Rises organised by Czech, Polish and Hungarian embassy in London, GB, 2002
 Visegrads fours /Hungarian culture centre CZ/ Praha, 2002
 7th PUSAN International film festival (South Korea), 2002
 10th Film Festival Palic, Croatia, 2003
 International Film Festival One World, ČR, 2003
 39th annual IFF Karlovy Vary, ČR, 2003
 EU XXL film - Filmweek - 20. – 27. November 2003, Vienna, Austria
 CROSSING EUROPE Filmfestival Linz, Austria, 2004
 7th Göttingen International Film Festival, Germany, 2004
 IGRIC, (2001), Annual prize for the best Slovak documentary of the year (SK)
 Slovak television prize (2002), 16 IFF Etnofilm Cadca.
 IDFF JiHlava, ČR, 2009
 ART Film, Trencianske Teplice, 2011
 CINEMATIC, Piestany, 2011
 IDFF Jihlava, 2011
 Best documentary prize winner, IFF CINEMATIC, Piestany (SK), 2013
 Warsaw INTERNATIONAL FILM FESTIVAL, best documentary nominee, (PL), 2013
 IDFF Jihlava, Special mention of the Jury, (CZ), 2013
 56th International documentary festival Leipzig, Prize of the ecumenical Jury, (GR), 2013
 56th International documentary festival Leipzig, Honorary mention, (Ger), 2013

Self screenings and retrospectives
 American University Washington (USA), 1999
 New School University New York (USA), 1999
 Slovak Cultural Centre CZ, retrospective, Prague (CZ), 2002
 Embassy of Slovak Republic - Washington (USA), 2003
 9th Annual World Convention of Association for the Study of Nationalities, Columbia University, New York, USA, 2004
 ERA NOWE HORIZONTY, Tesín, PL, 2005
 Anthology of Film Archives, New York, USA, 2006

References

 Normalization Honorary Mention at DOK Leipzig
 Normalization Prize of the Ecumenical Jury at DOK Leipzig
 Robert Kirchhoff at  Doc Alliance
 Producer of Made in Ash at Audiovisual Information Center Slovakia
 Normalization at One World Film Festival
 Film New Europe
 Film Festival Ostrava
 Article in The Slovak Spectator
 Cinematik Film Festival
 Normalization at DOK Revue
 Normalization at Film.sk
 Interview with Robert Kirchhoff at frequency.com
 Robert Kirchhoff Film Catalogue at Maison du doc
 Review of Hey, You Slovaks at Variety.com
 Hey, You Slovaks! at Timeout.com
 Article in the Slovak Spectator about Hey, You Slovaks!
 Ghost in the Machine at Nisimazine.eu
 Ghost in the Machine at Art Film Fest

External links
 

1968 births
Living people
Slovak film directors
Slovak screenwriters
Male screenwriters
Sun in a Net Awards winners
Film people from Bratislava
Academic staff of the Academy of Performing Arts in Bratislava